In number theory, a narcissistic number (also known as a pluperfect digital invariant (PPDI), an Armstrong number (after Michael F. Armstrong) or a plus perfect number) in a given number base  is a number that is the sum of its own digits each raised to the power of the number of digits.

Definition
Let  be a natural number. We define the narcissistic function for base   to be the following:
 
where  is the number of digits in the number in base , and 
 
is the value of each digit of the number. The natural numbers  are trivial narcissistic numbers for all , all other narcissistic numbers are nontrivial narcissistic numbers.

Thus, any narcissistic number must satisfy the inequality . Beyond this value ,  always.

Every base  that is not a multiple of nine has at least one three-digit narcissistic number. The bases that do not are
2, 72, 90, 108, 153, 270, 423, 450, 531, 558, 630, 648, 738, 1044, 1098, 1125, 1224, 1242, 1287, 1440, 1503, 1566, 1611, 1620, 1800, 1935, ... 

There are only 89 narcissistic numbers in base 10, of which the largest is

115,132,219,018,763,992,565,095,597,973,971,522,401

with 39 digits.

Narcissistic numbers and cycles of Fb for specific b 
All numbers are represented in base . '#' is the length of each known finite sequence.

Extension to negative integers
Narcissistic numbers can be extended to the negative integers by use of a signed-digit representation to represent each integer.

Programming example

Python 
The example below implements the narcissistic function described in the definition above to search for narcissistic functions and cycles in Python. 
def ppdif(x, b):
    y = x
    digit_count = 0
    while y > 0:
        digit_count = digit_count + 1
        y = y // b
    total = 0
    while x > 0:
        total = total + pow(x % b, digit_count)
        x = x // b
    return total

def ppdif_cycle(x, b):
    seen = []
    while x not in seen:
        seen.append(x)
        x = ppdif(x, b)
    cycle = []
    while x not in cycle:
        cycle.append(x)
        x = ppdif(x, b)
    return cycleThe following Python program determines whether the integer entered is a Narcissistic / Armstrong number or not.def no_of_digits(num):
    i = 0
    while num > 0:
        num //= 10
        i+=1

    return i

def required_sum(num):
    i = no_of_digits(num)
    s = 0
    
    while num > 0:
        digit = num % 10
        num //= 10
        s += pow(digit, i)
        
    return s

num = int(input("Enter number:"))
s = required_sum(num)
     
if s == num:
    print("Armstrong Number")
else:
    print("Not Armstrong Number")

Java 
The following Java program determines whether the integer entered is a Narcissistic / Armstrong number or not.

import java.util.Scanner;

public class ArmstrongNumber {

    public static void main(String[] args) {
        Scanner in = new Scanner(System.in);
        System.out.println("Enter the number: ");
        int num = in.nextInt();
        double sum = requiredSum(num);
        if (num == sum) {
            System.out.println("Armstrong Number");
        }
        else {
            System.out.println("Not an Armstrong Number");
        }
    }

    public static int noOfDigits(int num) { 
        int i;
        for (i = 0; num > 0; i++) {
            num /= 10;
        }
        return i;
    }

    public static double requiredSum(int num) {
        int i = noOfDigits(num);
        double sum = 0;
        while (num > 0) {
            int digit = num % 10;
            num /= 10;
            sum += Math.pow(digit, i);
        }
        return sum;
    }
}

C# 
The following C# program determines whether the integer entered is a Narcissistic / Armstrong number or not.
using System;

public class Program
{
    public static void Main()
    {
        Console.WriteLine("Enter the number:");
        int value = int.Parse(Console.ReadLine());

        if (value == RequiredSum(value))
        {
            Console.WriteLine("Armstrong Number");
        }
        else 
        {
            Console.WriteLine("Not an Armstrong Number");
        }
    }

    private static int CountDigits(int num)
    {
        int i = 0; 
        for (;num > 0; ++i) num /= 10;

        return i;    
    }

    private static int RequiredSum(int num)
    {
        int count = CountDigits(num);

        int sum = 0;
        while (num > 0)
        {
            sum += (int)Math.Pow(num % 10, count);
            num /= 10;
        }

        return sum;
    }
}

C 
The following C program determines whether the integer entered is a Narcissistic / Armstrong number or not.
#include <stdio.h>
#include <stdlib.h>
#include <stdbool.h>

int getNumberOfDigits(int n);
bool isArmstrongNumber(int candidate);

int main()
{
    int userNumber = 0;
    printf("Enter a number to verify if it is an Armstrong number: ");
    scanf("%d", &userNumber);
    printf("Is %d an Armstrong number?: %s\n", userNumber,  isArmstrongNumber(userNumber) ? "true" : "false");
    return 0;
}

bool isArmstrongNumber(int candidate)
{
    int numberOfDigits = getNumberOfDigits(candidate);
    int sum = 0;
    for (int i = candidate; i != 0; i /= 10)
    {
	    int num = i % 10;
	    int n = 1;
	    for (int j = 0; j < numberOfDigits; j++)
		{
			n *= num;
		}
	    sum += n;
    }
    return sum == candidate;
}

int getNumberOfDigits(int n)
{
    int sum = 0;
    while (n != 0)
    {
        n /= 10;
        ++sum;
    }
    return sum;
}

C++ 
The following C++ program determines whether the Integer entered is a Narcissistic / Armstrong number or not.
#include <iostream>
#include <cmath>

bool isNarcissistic(long n) {
    std::string s = std::to_string(n); // creating a string copy of n
    unsigned short l = s.length(); // getting the length of n
    unsigned short i = 0; long sum = 0; unsigned short base; // i will be used for iteration, sum is the sum of all of the digits to the power of the length of the number, and the base is the nth digit of n
    while (i<l) { // iterating over every digit of n
        base = s.at(i) - 48; // initializing the base of the number and subtracting 48 because the ascii for 0 is 48 and the ascii for 9 is 57 so if we subtract 48 it will give a integer version of that character.
        sum += pow(base,l); // adding base^length to the sum variable
        i++; // incrementing the iterator
    }
    return (n==sum) ? true : false; // if the n is equal to the sum return true, else, return false
}
int main() {
    unsigned int candidate; // declaring the candidate variable
    std::cout << "Enter a number to verify whether or not it is a narcissistic number: "; // printing the prompt to gather the input for the candidate variable.
    std::cin >> candidate; // taking the user's input
    std::cout << (std::string)((isNarcissistic(candidate)) ? "Yes" : "No") << std::endl; // printing "Yes" if it is an armstrong number and printing "No" if it isn't
    return 0; // returning 0 for a success
}

Ruby 
The following Ruby program determines whether the integer entered is a Narcissistic / Armstrong number or not.def narcissistic?(value) #1^3 + 5^3 + 3^3 = 1 + 125 + 27 = 153
  nvalue = []
  nnum = value.to_s
  nnum.each_char do |num|
    nvalue << num.to_i
    end
  sum = 0
  i = 0
  while sum <= value
    nsum = 0
    nvalue.each_with_index do |num,idx|
      nsum += num ** i
    end
    if nsum == value
      return true
    else
      i += 1
      sum += nsum
    end
  end
return false
end

See also
 Arithmetic dynamics
 Dudeney number
 Factorion
 Happy number
 Kaprekar's constant
 Kaprekar number
 Meertens number
 Perfect digit-to-digit invariant
 Perfect digital invariant
 Sum-product number

References

 Joseph S. Madachy, Mathematics on Vacation, Thomas Nelson & Sons Ltd. 1966, pages 163-175.
 Rose, Colin (2005), Radical narcissistic numbers, Journal of Recreational Mathematics,  33(4), 2004-2005, pages 250-254.
 Perfect Digital Invariants by Walter Schneider

External links
 Digital Invariants
 Armstrong Numbers
 Armstrong Numbers in base 2 to 16
 Armstrong numbers between 1-999 calculator
 

Arithmetic dynamics
Base-dependent integer sequences